The Eparchy of Khornabuji and Hereti is an eparchy (diocese) of the Georgian Orthodox Church with its seat in Khornabuji, Georgia. It has jurisdiction over Dedoplistsqaro Municipality in Georgia and historical region of Saingilo, currently part of Azerbaijan.

Heads

See also
Georgian Orthodox Church in Azerbaijan

References

External links
ХОРНАБУДЖСКАЯ ЕПАРХИЯ

Religious sees of the Georgian Orthodox Church
Georgian Orthodox Church in Azerbaijan
Dioceses established in the 21st century